MacDill Air Force Base (MacDill AFB)  is an active United States Air Force installation located 4 miles (6.4 km) south-southwest of downtown Tampa, Florida.

The "host wing" for MacDill AFB is the 6th Air Refueling Wing (6 ARW), assigned to the Eighteenth Air Force of the Air Mobility Command. The 6 ARW is commanded by Colonel Adam D. Bingham. The Wing Command Chief is Chief Master Sergeant Shae Gee.

MacDill Air Force Base, located in South Tampa, was constructed as MacDill Field, a U.S. Army Air Corps, later U.S. Army Air Forces, installation just prior to World War II. With the establishment of the U.S. Air Force as an independent service in September 1947, it became MacDill Air Force Base.  During the 1950s and 1960s, it was a Strategic Air Command (SAC) installation for B-47 Stratojet bombers. In the early 1960s, it transitioned to a Tactical Air Command (TAC) installation, briefly operating the F-84 Thunderstreak jet fighter before transitioning to the F-4 Phantom II.  During the 1960s, 1970s, and early 1980s, it operated F-4 Phantom II fighters under various fighter wings, followed by F-16 Fighting Falcons in the mid-1980s to early 1990s.

MacDill became an Air Mobility Command installation in 1996 and home to the 6th Air Refueling Wing, its 310th Airlift Squadron flying the C-37A, and its 50th Air Refueling Squadron and 91st Air Refueling Squadron flying the KC-135.  The 6 ARW is further augmented by the Air Force Reserve Command's 927th Air Refueling Wing  and 63d Air Refueling Squadron also flying KC-135s.

MacDill AFB is also home to the headquarters for two of the U.S. military's unified combatant commands: Headquarters, United States Central Command, and Headquarters, United States Special Operations Command. Both commands are independent from one another and each is commanded by a respective four-star general or admiral.

Two additional subunified commands are also headquartered at MacDill AFB: Commander, United States Marine Corps Forces Central Command, commanded by a three-star general, and United States Special Operations Command Central commanded by a two-star general or admiral.

History

MacDill AFB was originally established in 1939 as Southeast Air Base, Tampa. It is named in honor of Colonel Leslie MacDill (1889–1938).  A World War I aviator in the U.S. Army Air Service, Colonel MacDill was killed in a crash of his North American BC-1 on 8 November 1938 at Anacostia, DC. During World War I, he commanded an aerial gunnery school in St Jean de Monte, France.

Several dates are surrounding the history and official establishment of the installation that would become MacDill AFB. Official records report an establishment date of 24 May 1939, date construction began 6 September 1939, date of beneficial occupancy 11 March 1940, and formal dedication 16 April 1941. This last date is normally associated with the age of the base.  It was renamed MacDill Field on 1 December 1939.

III Bomber Command, the bombardment arm of 3d Air Force, was headquartered at MacDill Field.

Initial uses
After the war in Europe had broken out in September 1939, fears of Nazi U-boats attacking American merchant shipping in the Gulf of Mexico was the concern of the War Department and the Navy Department.  Though the United States was at peace, Lend Lease shipments of war goods to England and the establishment of Army and Navy bases in the Caribbean Sea south of Florida brought fears of U-boat attacks on shipping in the Gulf, especially oil tankers from refineries in Texas and Louisiana.

Flying operations at MacDill began in 1941 with the base's first mission being the defense of the Gulf of Mexico.  Aircraft and men were housed at Drew Army Airfield until the runways at MacDill were built. Despite these obstacles, flying operations commenced on 7 February 1941.  Hundreds of troops lived mostly in a mosquito-infested tent city at the field while barracks were being built.  An official flag-raising ceremony was sponsored by the Tampa Elk's Lodge on 16 June 1941.

Air defense of the Tampa Bay area was the mission of the 53d Pursuit Group (Interceptor), established at MacDill Field on 15 January 1941.  Equipped with the Seversky P-35, the 53d flew air defense patrols until the Japanese attack on Pearl Harbor.  It was reassigned to VI Fighter Command at Howard Field, Canal Zone to provide air defense of the Panama Canal.

The 29th Bombardment Group was moved to MacDill Field from Langley Field, Virginia, on  21 May 1940. Lieutenant Colonel Vincent J. Meloy, commander of the 29th Bombardment Group, led the first flight of aircraft to MacDill on 17 January 1941. This consisted of 14 aircraft flown from Langley Field to MacDill Field - three B-17s, two A-17s, and nine B-18s.  The group flew antisubmarine patrols over the eastern Gulf waters until June 1942, when the group was transitioned into a B-24 Liberator Operational Training Unit and assigned to II Bomber Command at Gowen Field, Idaho.The 44th Bombardment Group was activated at MacDill Field on 15 January 1941 equipped with the Consolidated B-24A Liberator.  The Liberator was originally ordered by the Royal Air Force as the "LB-30" or Liberator I.  These aircraft were destined for RAF Coastal Command for use in its battles against the U-boat menace. With a normal operating range of 2400 miles, the Liberators nearly doubled the effective range of the B-18, and it could fly long antisubmarine patrols equipped with a large bomb load to attack submarines if spotted.  Patrols were also flown over the Atlantic Coast east of Florida. After the 7 December 1941 Japanese attack on Pearl Harbor, the 44th was reassigned to Barksdale Field, Louisiana.

In addition to the antisubmarine mission, another prewar mission of MacDill Field was "Project X", the ferrying of combat aircraft eastward to the Philippines via ferrying routes set up by Ferrying Command over South Atlantic Ocean and Central Africa.  The aircraft were then ferried via India to Australia, where they were planned to be used to reinforce the Philippines Air Force.  These operations began in February 1941, and were performed by the 6th and 43d Bombardment Squadron flying the B-18 Bolo and B-17 Flying Fortress.  In just 60 days, 15 LB-30 and 63 B-17 aircraft departed MacDill via the South Atlantic and Africa to Australia.

World War II

With the United States's entry into World War II, the primary mission of MacDill Field became the training of bombardment units under III Bomber Command. In June 1942, the 21st Bombardment Group was assigned with B-26 Marauder medium bombers as the Operational Training Unit (OTU).Also, the group flew antisubmarine patrols over the Gulf of Mexico.

The B-26 earned the slogan "One a day in Tampa Bay" due to the number of early-model B-26 aircraft that ditched or crashed into the Tampa Bay waters surrounding MacDill Field. Early models of the B-26 aircraft proved hard to fly and land by many pilots due to its short wings, high landing speeds, and fighter-plane maneuverability.  Improvements to the Block 10 version of the aircraft, known as the B-26B-10, added six feet of additional wingspan and upgraded engines that eliminated most of these problems. Nine of the 12 combat groups that flew the B-26 in Europe were activated and trained at MacDill, and in combat, the B-26 enjoyed the lowest loss rate of any Allied bomber.

In addition, MacDill Field provided transitional training in the B-17 Flying Fortress.  The first Eighth Air Force Flying Fortress groups were trained at MacDill prior to their deployment to England in the summer of 1942.  Also, the command and control organizations for Eighth Air Force were organized and equipped at MacDill in 1942. Heavy bomber training ended in July 1942, as the B-17 group training mission was reassigned to II Bomber Command and moved to the Midwest and Western states.

Estimates of the number of crew members trained at the base during the war vary from 50,000 to 120,000, with as many as 15,000 troops stationed at MacDill Field at one time.  A contingent of Women's Army Corps  troops arrived in 1943. The base provided various forms of entertainment, including band concerts, live performers, and a movie theater.

Two films were made in Tampa during World War II with wartime themes: A Guy Named Joe (1943) starred Spencer Tracy and had scenes shot at MacDill; Air Force (1943) starred John Garfield and had scenes shot at Drew Field. In the latter film, MacDill-based B-26s were painted as Japanese bombers, and although the entire Tampa Bay area defenses were alerted to this, the U.S. Coast Guard still shot at the planes as they flew over the Gulf.

In late 1943, when Second Air Force began transitioning to B-29 Superfortress training, the B-17 mission returned to MacDill, which continued through the end of World War II.  As a result, the 21st Bombardment Group was disbanded on 10 October 1943, and the OTU that performed the B-17 training, the 488th Bombardment Group (Heavy), was activated in November 1943 with four bombardment training squadrons.

In an administrative reorganization by HQ Army Air Force on 1 May 1944, numbered training units in the Zone of the Interior (ZI) (continental United States) were redesignated as "Army Air Force Base Units". At MacDill, the 488th Bomb Group was redesignated as the 326th Army Air Forces Base Unit (Heavy Bombardment) and B-17 training squadron tail codes were designated as "H, J, K, and L".

Beginning in January 1944, the 11th Photographic Group used MacDill for its mission of photographic mapping in the US, and sent detachments to carry out similar operations in Africa, the CBI theater, the Near and Middle East, Mexico, Canada, Alaska, and the Caribbean.  The unit flew a mixture of B-17, B-24, B-25, B-29, F-2, F-9, F-10, and A-20 aircraft equipped with cartographic cameras.  The 11th PG inactivated in October 1944, being replaced by several intelligence and mapping training units at the airfield from 1945 through 1948.Several bases in Florida, including MacDill, also served as detention centers for German prisoners of war (POWs) in the latter part of 1944 and 1945. At its apex, 488 German POWs were interned at MacDill.

In February 1945, the 323d Combat Crew Training Wing (Very Heavy Bomber) was established at the base with a mission of training B-29 Superfortress aircrews.  The first training class began at the end of February. The B-29 Superfortress arrived at MacDill Field on 26 January 1945, with additional aircraft arriving during the spring and summer and the first B-29 aircrew graduating in May.  On 16 April 1945, MacDill was assigned to Continental Air Command, and became a primary training facility for aircrew assigned to the B-29 Superfortress.

On 24 June 1945, a hurricane hit the Tampa Bay area, and the B-17 aircraft were evacuated to Vichy Army Airfield, Missouri. At the end of June 1945, B-17 replacement crew training ended at the base.  With the end of the war in Europe and the B-17 being used almost exclusively in Europe, the need for replacement personnel by Eighth and Fifteenth Air Force units was ended.

The 326th Army Air Forces Base Unit was reorganized into an Army Air Forces separation (326th AAFBU (Separation Station) ) unit to process military demobilizations. The demobilization and separation functions became the major mission at MacDill in the fall of 1945, but a lack of personnel was the main inhibiting factor.  On 1 January 1946, with the closure of Drew Army Airfield, the demobilization and separation activities performed by the 301st Army Air Forces Base Unit (Separation Station) at Drew were transferred to MacDill Field, with the separation station remaining open until December 1949. With the end of hostilities in September 1945, the B-29 aircrew training program began to scale down and the base became a reception facility for returning Twentieth Air Force bomb groups from the Marianas.  These groups were:

462d Bombardment Group (Very Heavy) (November 1945)
497th Bombardment Group (Very Heavy) (January 1946)
498th Bombardment Group (Very Heavy) (January 1946)

The rapid demobilization after the war led these units to be inactivated during 1946.  Headquarters, III Fighter Command, moved from Drew Field in December 1945 and both III Bomber and III Fighter Commands were inactivated on 8 April 1946.

Strategic Air Command

307th Bombardment Group

On 21 March 1946, Continental Air Command was redesignated as Strategic Air Command (SAC).  On 4 August 1946, SAC activated the 307th Bombardment Group (Very Heavy) as the host unit at MacDill, initially equipped with Boeing B-29 Superfortresses.  Known initial operational squadrons of the group were the 370th, 371st, and 372d Bombardment Squadrons.

The group was selected as SAC's first antisubmarine unit in December 1946. A precursor to similar SAC units, the group began training other SAC combat units in antisubmarine warfare and operational procedures until this mission became solely assumed by the U.S. Navy.  In February 1947, the group began operating a B-29 transition training school and standardized combat training for all SAC units, and in September 1947, the bomb group and the base became a U.S. Air Force organization and installation with its divestment from the U.S. Army and the establishment of the Air Force as an independent branch of the U.S. armed forces.

The unit was redesignated as the 307th Bombardment Wing, Medium, on 12 July 1948.  Under the wing designation, the 306th Bombardment Group (effective 12 August 1948) and 307th Bombardment Group (effective 12 July 1948) were attached to the wing.  This brought three additional operational squadrons (367th, 368th, and 369th Bombardment Squadrons) under the wing's command.  In 1952, the 307th Bombardment Wing was bestowed the lineage, honors, and history of the USAAF 307th Bombardment Group of World War II fame.

On 1 September 1950, the 307th Bomb Group with its three squadrons of B-29s was deployed to Far East Air Force  Bomber Command, Provisional, at Kadena Air Base, Okinawa, engaging in combat operations during the Korean War.  From Kadena, the 307th staged attacks against the rapidly advancing communist forces in South Korea.  While in Okinawa, the 307th was awarded the Republic of Korea Presidential Unit Citation for its air strikes against enemy forces in Korea. It was also awarded the Distinguished Unit Citation and several campaign streamers.

The 307th BG returned from deployment on 10 February 1951, but elements of the group remained deployed in Okinawa on a permanent basis.  Later in 1951, the B-29s of the group at MacDill were replaced by the Boeing B-50D Superfortress.

Also on 1 September 1950, the 306th Bomb Group was transferred to the newly activated 306th Bombardment Wing at MacDill and continued the wing's training mission.

The 307th Bomb Wing was inactivated at MacDill on 16 June 1952 and the 307th Bomb Group was permanently reassigned to Kadena Air Base upon the inactivation of the wing at MacDill.

306th Bombardment Wing 

On 1 September 1950, the 306th Bombardment Wing was activated at MacDill AFB and became SAC's first operational B-47 jet bomber wing.  Upon activation, operational units of the wing were the 367th, 368th, and 369th Bombardment Squadrons under the 306th Bombardment Group, which was transferred from the 307th BMW.

Deliveries of the new Boeing B-47A Stratojet to the Air Force and SAC began in December 1950, and the aircraft entered service in May 1951 with the 306th Bombardment Wing. The 306th was intended to act as a training unit to prepare future B-47 crews.  As such, the B-47As were primarily training aircraft and were not considered as being combat ready.  None of the B-47As ever had any operational duty in front-line SAC combat squadrons.

On 19 November 1951, the 306th received its first operational Boeing B-47B and christened it The Real McCoy in honor of Colonel Michael N. W. McCoy, USAF, the wing commander of the 306th, who flew it from the Boeing Wichita plant to MacDill.  During 1952, the 306th developed combat procedures and techniques for the new bomber and the wing soon emerged as a leader in jet-bombardment tactics and strategies. The first Boeing KC-97E Stratofreighter assigned to SAC was delivered to the 306th Air Refueling Squadron at MacDill on 14 July 1951. In-flight refueling operations started in May 1952 with KC-97s refueling B-47s on operational training missions leading toward combat-ready status.

In 1953, the 306th became the first operational B-47 bombardment wing. The wing became the backbone of the US nuclear deterrence strategy by maintaining high levels of ground alert in the US and at overseas bases. The wing was also awarded the Air Force Outstanding Unit Award for its role as a pioneer and leader in jet bombardment tactics.  B-47Bs from the 306th Bomb Wing began a 90-day rotational training mission to England in June 1953, marking the first overseas deployment of the B-47.  Captain (Major selectee) Glenn A. McConnell led the first four B-47s to RAF Brize Norton, UK. For its role in advancing jet bombardment tactics, the wing was again awarded the Air Force Outstanding Unit Award.  Additional deployments were made to RAF Fairford England, June – September 1953, and at Ben Guerir AB, French Morocco (later Morocco), January –  February 1955, October 1956 – January 1957 and October 1957.

In 1954, SAC designated specific air refueling organizations and the 306th Air Refueling Squadron became ready to support B-47 operations across the command. During 1954, the more advanced B-47Es, equipped with ejection seats, improved electronics, and a white reflective paint scheme on the underside of the fuselage, replaced the 306th BMW B-47Bs.

During 1954–55, MacDill AFB and the wing also served as a backdrop for part of the Paramount Pictures film Strategic Air Command starring James Stewart and June Allyson, a portion of which was filmed in and around both the 305th Bombardment Wing and 306th Bombardment Wing areas and their B-47 aircraft at MacDill AFB.

As SAC's B-47s were being phased out of the inventory, inactivation planning of the 306th BMW also began. Phase down and transfer of B-47s was started, and by 15 February 1963, the wing was no longer capable of fulfilling its part of the strategic war plan.  On 1 April 1963, SAC inactivated the 306th BMW at MacDill and reactivated it the same day at McCoy AFB, Florida as a B-52D Stratofortress and KC-135A Stratotanker heavy bombardment wing.  McCoy AFB was the former Pinecastle AFB, having been renamed after Colonel Michael N. W. McCoy following his death in a B-47 mishap northwest of downtown Orlando, Florida, in 1957 while in command of the 321st Bombardment Wing at Pinecastle.

305th Bombardment Wing 
On 2 January 1951, the 305th Bombardment Wing was activated at MacDill AFB and became the second SAC wing to receive the B-47 jet bomber.  Operational squadrons of the wing were the 305th, 364th, 365th, and 366th Bombardment Squadrons.  Initially training with Boeing B-29 and B-50 Superfortresses, the 305th also received its first Boeing KC-97 Stratofreighter later in 1951. Following this, the group began training heavily in its new dual mission of strategic bombardment and aerial refueling.

The 809th Air Division (809th AD) took over host unit responsibilities for MacDill AFB on 16 June 1952.  The 809th AD consisted of the 305th and 306th Bombardment Wings, which were both assigned to the base.

In June 1952, the 305th upgraded to the all-jet Boeing B-47B Stratojet. The wing continued strategic bombardment and refueling operations from MacDill and deployed overseas three times, once to England (September–December 1953) and twice to North Africa (November 1955 – January 1956 and January – March 1957), in keeping with its mission of global bombardment and air refueling operations.  Two wing B-47s set speed records on 28 July 1953 when one flew from RCAF Goose Bay, Labrador, to RAF Fairford, England, in 4:14 hours and the other flew from Limestone AFB, Maine, to RAF Fairford in 4:45 hours.

In May 1959, the 305th Bomb Wing with B-47s was reassigned to Bunker Hill AFB, later renamed Grissom AFB, Indiana.  The 809th AD inactivated on 1 June 1959 with the reassignment of the 305th Bomb Wing.

Alert detachment operations 
Although control of MacDill AFB would pass from SAC to TAC in the early 1960s, SAC continued to maintain a periodic presence at MacDill in the form of dispersal alert operations of B-52 and KC-135 aircraft from other SAC bombardment wings, using the extant SAC Alert Facility at MacDill.  These operations continued until the early 1980s.

Air Defense Command / Aerospace Defense Command
Air Defense Command (ADC) became a major tenant unit at MacDill in 1954 with the establishment of a mobile radar station on the base to support the permanent ADC radar network in the United States sited around the perimeter of the country. This deployment was projected to be operational by mid-1952. Funding, constant site changes, construction, and equipment delivery delayed deployment.

This site at MacDill, designated as M-129 became operational on 1 August 1954 when the 660th Aircraft Control and Warning Squadron was assigned to the base by the 35th Air Division.  MacDill became the first operational mobile radar under the first phase of the program. The 660th ACWS initially used an AN/MPS-7 radar, and by 1958, MacDill also had AN/GPS-3 and AN/MPS-14 radars. During the following year, the AN/GPS-3 and AN/MPS-7 sets were replaced by AN/FPS-20A search and AN/FPS-6B height-finder sets.

During 1961, MacDill AFB joined the Semi Automatic Ground Environment (SAGE) system, initially feeding data to Site DC-09 at Gunter AFB, Alabama.  After joining SAGE, the squadron was redesignated as the 660th Radar Squadron (SAGE) on 1 March 1961.  In 1961, an AN/FPS-7B assumed search duties and an additional height-finder radar was added in the form of an AN/FPS-26.

In 1963, an AN/FPS-90 height-finder radar replaced the AN/FPS-6B, and on 31 July 1963 the site was redesignated as NORAD ID Z-129.  In addition to the main facility, Z-129 operated several unmanned gap filler sites:

Winter Garden, Florida (M-129A): 
Inverness, Florida (M-129B): 

In 1966, the AN/FPS-26 was modified into an AN/FSS-7 submarine-launched ballistic missile detection and warning radar, part of the 14th Missile Warning Squadron. Around 1966, Site Z-129 became a joint-use facility with the Federal Aviation Administration  and the search radar was modified to an AN/FPS-7E model.  In 1968, ADC was redesignated as Aerospace Defense Command (ADC).  In 1979, Site Z-129 came under Tactical Air Command (TAC) jurisdiction with the inactivation of ADC and the activation of Air Defense, Tactical Air Command, which was inactivated on 15 November 1980 and subsumed within TAC.

The FSS-7 (the final such system in the USAF inventory) remained in use for about a year after the host 660th Radar Squadron inactivated and was reassigned as Det 1, 20th Missile Warning Squadron. The ground-to-air transmitter/receiver  site was retained until the Joint Surveillance System  switch-over circa 1984, with the radios being maintained by the 1928th Communications Squadron of the Air Force Communications Command.

Tactical Air Command
The first attempt to close MacDill AFB was made in 1960, when the impending phaseout of SAC's B-47 bombers caused it to be listed as surplus and slated for closure.  However, the Cuban Missile Crisis of 1962 highlighted the base's strategic location and its usefulness as a staging area.  As a result, the cuts were stayed and the base repurposed for a tactical mission with fighter aircraft. In response to the crisis, the United States Strike Command was also established at MacDill as a crisis response force; it was one of the first unified commands, a command that draws manpower and equipment from all branches of the U.S. military.

In 1962, MacDill AFB was transferred from SAC to TAC.  Bomber aircraft remained home-based at MacDill until the 306th Bombardment Wing's transfer to McCoy AFB, and SAC continued to maintain a tenant presence at MacDill through the 1980s, using their alert facility as a dispersal location for B-52 and KC-135 aircraft.  But for all practical purposes, the 1960s marked MacDill's transition from a bomber-centric SAC base to a fighter-centric TAC installation.  Under TAC, MacDill AFB remained a fighter base for almost 30 years, but other changes went on in the background.

12th Tactical Fighter Wing 
Upon MacDill AFB's transfer to TAC, the 12th Tactical Fighter Wing (12t TFW) was reactivated on 17 April 1962 and assigned to Ninth Air Force. Initially, its only operational squadron was the 559th Tactical Fighter Squadron.  The mission of the 12th TFW was to be prepared for tactical worldwide deployments and operations.  Until 1964, the wing flew obsolete Republic F-84F Thunderjets reclaimed from the Air National Guard.

In January 1964, the wing was chosen to be the first Air Force combat wing to convert to the new McDonnell-Douglas F-4C Phantom II.  It was expanded as follows:

557th Tactical Fighter Squadron
558th Tactical Fighter Squadron
559th Tactical Fighter Squadron
555th Tactical Fighter Squadron

(Activated on 8 January 1964 as part of a wing transition from three squadrons of 25 aircraft each to four squadrons of 18 aircraft each)

The wing was soon involved in F-4C firepower demonstrations, exercises, and ultimately, at the Paris Air Show.  The conflict in Southeast Asia was escalating, and throughout 1965, the wing supported Pacific Air Forces Contingency Operations by rotating combat squadrons quarterly to Naha Air Base in the Ryuku Islands.  The 12th TFW began its permanent deployment to the first Air Force expeditionary airfield at Cam Ranh Bay Air Base, South Vietnam, on 6 November 1965.

The 12th TFW combat squadrons initially scheduled for deployment to Vietnam were the 555th, 557th, and 558th TFS. Ultimately, the 559th TFS took the place of the 555th when the squadron was diverted to a second TDY with the 51st Fighter-Interceptor Wing at Naha Air Base, Okinawa, followed by a reassignment to the 8th TFW at Ubon Royal Thai Air Force Base, Thailand. Still later, the 555th was assigned to the 432d TRW at Udon Royal Thai Air Force Base.

15th Tactical Fighter Wing 

On 17 April 1962, the 15th Tactical Fighter Wing was activated at MacDill and assigned to 9th Air Force.  Operational squadrons of the wing and squadron tail codes were:

 45th Tactical Fighter squadron (FC)
46th Tactical Fighter squadron (FD)
47th Tactical Fighter squadron (FE)
43rd Tactical Fighter Squadron (FB)

(Activated on 8 January 1964 as part of a wing transition from three squadrons of 25 aircraft each to four squadrons of 18 aircraft each)

The 12th and 15th TFWs constituted the 836th Air Division at MacDill AFB on 1 July 1962.

Initially equipped with theF-84F Thunderjet, in 1964 the 15th TFW subsequently upgraded to the tail-coded McDonnell-Douglas F-4C Phantom II.

The mission of the 15th TFW was to conduct tactical fighter combat crew training.  The wing participated in various exercises, operations, and readiness tests of TAC, and trained pilots and provided logistical support for the 12th Tactical Fighter Wing. Reorganized as a mission-capable unit at the time of the Cuban Missile Crisis of 1962, it returned afterwards to a training mission.

With the departure of the 12th TFW in 1965, the 15th TFW became the host unit at MacDill with the unit's mission becoming a formal training unit for F-4 aircrews prior to their deployment to Southeast Asia.  The wing deployed 16 F-4s to Seymour Johnson AFB, NC, during the USS Pueblo crisis in 1968.

In 1965, the wing deployed its 43rd, 45th, 46th, and 47th Tactical Fighter Squadrons to Southeast Asia, where they participated in the air defense commitment for the Philippines from Clark AB and flew combat missions from Cam Rahn Bay Air Base in South Vietnam and Ubon Royal Thai Air Force Base in Thailand. Members of the 45th TFS achieved the first U.S. Air Force aerial victories of the Vietnam War when they destroyed two MiGs on 10 July 1965.  Captains Thomas S. Roberts, Ronald C. Anderson, Kenneth E. Holcombe, and Arthur C. Clark received credit for these kills.

Beginning on 8 February 1969, the 13th Bombardment Squadron, Tactical, began Martin B-57G (Tail Code: FK) light bomber aircrew training at MacDill. The squadron was inactivated on 1 October 1970 and redesignated as the 4424th Combat Crew Training Squadron.

Also in 1970, U.S. Strike Command was renamed United States Readiness Command.

The 43rd TFS was reassigned to Elmendorf AFB, Alaska, on 4 January 1970 and the 15th TFW was inactivated on 1 October 1970, being replaced by the 1st Tactical Fighter Wing (1st TFW).

Cuban Missile Crisis
During the 1962 Cuban Missile Crisis, these units were deployed to MacDill AFB in addition to the assigned 12th and 15th TFWs in preparation for planned airstrikes on Cuba:

 27th Tactical Fighter Wing, 60 F-100s(Deployed from Cannon AFB, New Mexico)
 363d Tac Reconnaissance Wing, 33 RF-101s, 31 RB-66s(Deployed from Shaw AFB, South Carolina)
 622d Air Refueling Squadron, 20 KB-50Js(Aerial tankers deployed from England AFB, Louisiana)

The MacDill-based 12th and 15th Tactical Fighter Wings were subsequently designated as the 836th Air Division.  The 836th AD was committed to provide 100 sorties in the planned first strike. They were to also press napalm and rocket attacks against surface-to-air missile sites at Mariel and Sagua La Grande, as well as the airfields at Santa Clara, Los Banos, and San Julien.

The 836th commitment for the second strike was to provide 64 sorties concentrating on the Los Banos airfield, two AAA sites, and the SSM launchers at San Diego de las Vegas and Pinar Del Rio.  Finally, 42 aircraft were to strike Los Banos MiG base a third time and the Santa Clara MiG base, Sagua La Grande and Mariel SAM sites each a second time.  The Cuban missile confrontation was ultimately resolved, and the air strikes, which an invasion of Cuba would have followed, were never launched.

1st Tactical Fighter Wing

On 10 January 1970, the 1st Tactical Fighter Wing was reassigned without personnel or equipment to MacDill, the wing being transferred from Aerospace Defense Command (ADC) to TAC from Hamilton AFB, California.  Initially, the 1st TFW operated with the same tactical fighter squadron designations used by the 15th TFW until 1 July 1971, when they were redesignated as:

 45th TFS -> 27th Tactical Fighter Squadron (FD/FF) (F-4E)
 46th TFS -> 71st Tactical Fighter Squadron (FB/FF) (F-4E)
 47th TFS -> 94th Tactical Fighter Squadron (FE/FF) (F-4E)
 4424Th TFTS -> 4530th Combat Crew Training Squadron (FK/FS) (B-57G)(Note: squadron discontinued 30 June 1972.)

In 1972, the 1st TFW standardized all of its aircraft with the common wing tail code "FF".

At MacDill, the 1st TFW was a combat-coded operational tactical fighter wing, assuming operational commitments of the 15th TFW. The 1st also assumed an F-4 transitional and replacement pilot and weapons-systems officer training role in 1971, with some of its aircrews and equipment being deployed from time to time in various tactical exercises.

On 1 July 1975, the 1st TFW and its operational squadrons were reassigned to Langley AFB, Virginia, without personnel or equipment for transition to the F-15 Eagle.

56th Tactical Fighter Wing / 56th Tactical Training Wing

On 30 June 1975, the 56th Tactical Fighter Wing became the new host unit at MacDill, being reassigned from Nakhon Phanom Royal Thai Air Force Base, Thailand.  Operational squadrons of the wing were:

61st Tactical Fighter Squadron (former 27th TFS, yellow tail stripe)
62d Tactical Fighter Squadron (former 73rd TFS, blue tail stripe)
63d Tactical Fighter Squadron (former 94th TFS, red tail stripe)
13th Tactical Fighter Squadron (white tail stripe, inactivated at MacDill during conversion from F-4D to F-16A/B in 1981 and reactivated at Misawa AB, Japan as an F-16 squadron)
 72nd Tactical Fighter Squadron (black tail stripe)(F-16A/B/C/D Activated 1 July 1981, inactivated 19 June 1992)

In 1975, the 56th TFW assumed the F-4E aircraft of the reassigned 1st TFW and all aircraft tail codes were changed to "MC".

The wing conducted F-4E replacement training for pilots, weapon systems officers, and aircraft maintenance personnel and conducted a service test of TAC's "production oriented maintenance organization" (POMO) in 1976 and converted to the POMO concept in March 1977.  In addition, the wing converted from the F-4E to F-4D between October 1977 and September 1978.

In 1980 and 1981, the wing upgraded to the Block 10 General Dynamics F-16A/B Fighting Falcon.  With the arrival of the F-16, the wing designation was changed to 56th Tactical Training Wing (56 TTW) on 1 October 1981.  The aircraft were upgraded to the more capable Block 30 and 42 F-16C/D in 1991.

In 1980, the new Rapid Deployment Joint Task Force  was activated, and in 1983, it became United States Central Command.  Also in 1987, United States Special Operations Command  was activated at MacDill AFB, occupying the former facilities of USREDCOM.

At Super Bowl XVIII and again at Super Bowl XXV, both played at Tampa Stadium, 56th Tactical Training Wing aircraft performed the flyover and missing man formation after the national anthem.

On 1 October 1991, the 56th TTW was redesignated as the 56th Fighter Wing (56 FW).  Following inactivation of TAC, the 56 FW was reassigned to the newly established Air Combat Command (ACC) on 1 June 1992.

After Cold War and BRAC 1991
By the early 1990s and the end of the Cold War, the U.S. was looking to downsize the military and eliminate a large number of bases in the United States as a cost-savings measure.  MacDill AFB figured prominently in this; the Tampa area had seen substantial increases in commercial air traffic at the two international airports within 10 nautical miles of MacDill, creating hazardous conditions for F-16 training, and the noise associated with the high-performance jets was deemed unsuitable for high-density residential areas such as those around MacDill.  As a result, the 1991 Defense Base Realignment and Closure Commission (BRAC) ordered that all flight-line activities cease at MacDill AFB by 1993.

As a result of the BRAC decision, the F-16 training mission and the 56th Fighter Wing were moved without personnel or equipment to Luke Air Force Base, outside of Phoenix, Arizona, and was reassigned to Air Education and Training Command.  The wing's F-16 aircraft were transferred to other Regular U.S. Air Force, Air Force Reserve Command, and Air National Guard wings and squadrons.

6th Air Mobility Wing and 927th Air Refueling Wing (Associate)
In August 1992, just prior to the landfall of Hurricane Andrew in southern Florida, the 31st Fighter Wing (31 FW) and the Air Force Reserve's 482d Fighter Wing, both based at Homestead AFB, executed an emergency hurricane evacuation of all of their flyable F-16C and F-16D aircraft, with the bulk of those aircraft temporarily staging at MacDill.  Given the level of destruction at Homestead AFB, these fighter aircraft remained at MacDill for several months thereafter.

In 1993, with the help of local Representative Bill Young (R-FL), the flight-line closure order for MacDill was rescinded and the National Oceanic and Atmospheric Administration transferred from their former aircraft operations center at Miami International Airport to Hangar 5 at MacDill AFB to use the base and its flight line as their new home station for weather reconnaissance and research flights.

On 1 January 1994, the Air Combat Command's  6th Air Base Wing (6 ABW) stood up at MacDill AFB to operate the base and provide support services for the large and growing number of tenant units, as well as to provide services for transient air units.  Later that year, the base served as the primary staging facility for Operation Uphold Democracy in Haiti.

This staging was considered evidence of the quality and usefulness of the MacDill runway and flight line, even in light of the high civilian air traffic levels in the Tampa Bay area from nearby Tampa International Airport, St. Petersburg-Clearwater International Airport, and Peter O. Knight Airport.  With further congressional prodding and lobbying, MacDill was chosen as the site for a KC-135 air refueling mission.  With the arrival of 12 KC-135R tankers and the 91st Air Refueling Squadron from Malmstrom Air Force Base, Montana, the 6 ABW was renamed the 6th Air Refueling Wing (6 ARW) on 1 October 1996 and transferred from ACC to the Air Mobility Command (AMC).

In January 2001, the 310th Airlift Squadron (310 AS) was activated at the base, flying the CT-43A and EC-135Y, the former aircraft providing executive transport to the commander of United States Southern Command  in Miami and the latter aircraft providing executive transport and airborne command post capabilities to the commanders of USCENTCOM and USSOCOM at MacDill.  New C-37A aircraft were delivered starting in 2001, and the CT-43 and EC-135s were subsequently removed from service.  The 310th's primary mission is dedicated airlift support for the commanders of USCENTCOM, USSOCOM, and USSOUTHCOM.  With the addition of the 310 AS, the wing was given its current designation as the 6th Air Mobility Wing (6 AMW).

In April 2008, pursuant to BRAC action, the Air Force Reserve Command's 927th Air Refueling Wing  relocated from Selfridge Air National Guard Base, Michigan, to MacDill AFB, where it became an associate wing to the 6 AMW, also flying KC-135R aircraft.

Tenant units

In late 2003/early 2004, U.S. Naval Forces Central Command vacated its Tampa "rear headquarters" at MacDill AFB, a complex that was established in the early 1990s following the first Gulf War and commanded by a flag officer, either an upper half or lower half rear admiral concurrently assigned as the USNAVCENT/US 5th Fleet Deputy Commander (DEPCOMUSNAVCENT/DEPCOMFIFTHFLT), and his staff when they were not forward deployed to the Persian Gulf region.  In vacating the MacDill AFB facility, all USNAVCENT staff activities were consolidated at COMUSNAVCENT/COMFIFTHFLT headquarters in Manama, Bahrain.

NAVCENT's facility at MacDill AFB was subsequently turned over to the Deputy Commander, U.S. Marine Forces Central Command (DEPCOMUSMARCENT), and his staff.  It would later become the overall Headquarters, U.S. Marine Forces Central Command, while the Commanding General for MARCENT (COMUSMARCENT) would remain a dual-hatted function of the Commanding General, I Marine Expeditionary Force (I MEF) at Camp Pendleton, California.  From late 2003 until 2012, the Commanding General remained in California, while his MARCENT staff primarily resided at MacDill AFB with an additional forward element at Naval Support Activity Bahrain in Manama, Bahrain.  In 2012, the COMUSMARCENT and CG I MEF billets were broken into separate billets and COMUSMARCENT took up full-time residency in MARCENT's headquarters facility at MacDill AFB, upgrading the facility to a 3-star headquarters.

Also in late 2004/early 2005, Naval Reserve Center Tampa vacated its obsolescent waterfront location in downtown Tampa, consolidated with the former Naval Reserve Center St. Petersburg adjacent to Coast Guard Air Station Clearwater, and relocated to a newly constructed facility on the south side of MacDill AFB.  In 2006, this facility was renamed Navy Operational Support Center Tampa, concurrent with the shift in name of the U.S. Naval Reserve to the U.S. Navy Reserve and its greater integration into the Fleet and shore establishment of the Regular Navy.  Under the command of an active duty full-time support (FTS) U.S. Navy Captain, NOSC Tampa provides administrative support for all Navy Reserve personnel assigned to both local independent Navy Reserve units at NOSC Tampa and to the various joint and service commands and activities at MacDill AFB, CGAS Clearwater and Marine Corps Reserve Center Tampa.

The Joint Communications Support Element (JCSE) is a joint command headquartered at MacDill AFB that deploys to provide en route, early entry, scalable command, control, communications and computer (C4) support to the geographical Unified Combatant Commands, the U.S. Special Operations Command, and other military commands and U.S. Government agencies as directed.  On order, JCSE provides additional C4 services within 72 hours to support larger Commander, Joint Task Force/Commander, Joint Special Operations Task Force (CJTF/CJSOTF) headquarters across the full spectrum of operations.  JCSE is commanded by a U.S. Army Colonel and consists of a Headquarters Support Squadron (HSS), a Communications Support Detachment (CSD), three active-duty joint communications squadrons: the 1st, 2nd and 3rd Joint Communications Squadrons, and the 4th Joint Communications Squadron, the 4th being a U.S. Army Reserve squadron. All are located on the JCSE compound at MacDill AFB.  JCSE also includes two additional joint communications support squadrons from the Air National Guard: the 224th Joint Communications Support Squadron (224 JCSS) of the Georgia Air National Guard in Brunswick, Georgia, and the 290th Joint Communications Support Squadron (290 JCSS) of the Florida Air National Guard located in its own compound separate from JCSE at MacDill AFB.

As mentioned above, the 290th Joint Communications Support Squadron (290 JCSS) of the Florida Air National Guard is another tenant unit at MacDill AFB.  The 290 JCSS provides Chairman of the Joint Chiefs of Staff-directed globally deployable, en route, and early entry communications support to geographic combatant commands, the United States Special Operations Command, individual U.S. armed services, other Department of Defense activities and combat support agencies, other U.S. Government agencies, and the State of Florida. The squadron deploys modular, scalable support to large Joint and Combined War-fighting Command and Control (C2) headquarters nodes.  Under its Title 10 USC "Federal" mission, the 290 JCSS is associated with the U.S. Transportation Command's Joint Enabling Capabilities Command (JECC) and the Joint Communications Support Element (JCSE).  As a USAF organization, the 290 JCSS is operationally gained by the Air Mobility Command (AMC).  Under its Title 32 USC "state" mission, the squadron reports to the Governor of Florida via the Assistant Adjutant General for Air (ATAG-Air) and The Adjutant General (TAG) of the Florida National Guard./

The newest tenant command at MacDill AFB is the 598th Range Squadron (598 RANS), an Air Combat Command (ACC) unit that was activated at the MacDill AFB Auxiliary Field at Avon Park Air Force Range, Florida on 22 September 2015.  The 598 RANS replaced Detachment 1, 23d Fighter Group, which had previously managed the range and additional facilities at MacDill AFB.  The 598 RANS operates both the Avon Park Air Force Range (APAFR) and the 23rd Wing Deployed Unit Complex (DUC) located at MacDill AFB.  The DUC is a separate flight line facility on the west side of MacDill AFB for transient military flight crews, maintenance crews and fighter and attack aircraft utilizing the APAFR.  This permits visiting squadrons to have ready access to APAFR while concurrently taking advantage of the more robust billeting, messing and aircraft maintenance support capabilities at MacDill AFB.  This combination of facilities between MacDill AFB and the APAFR provides extensive, diversified and convenient training airspace and ranges with unique training capabilities for military air, ground and air-to-ground training.  The squadron's higher headquarters, the 23d Fighter Group, is located at Moody Air Force Base, Georgia.

In September 2019, the 310th Airlift squadron inactivated. The squadron had operated three C-37A Gulfstream V and provided global special assignment airlift missions (SAAM) in support of the commanders of the unified combatant commands. As a result, with its primary mission now aerial refueling, the 6th Air Mobility Wing was re-designated as the 6th Air Refueling Wing.

Super Bowl flyovers

The flyover and Missing man formations for Super Bowl XXV, Super Bowl XXXV and Super Bowl XLIII, played at Raymond James Stadium, came from KC-135 aircraft from MacDill's 6th Air Mobility Wing, with additional flyovers by a B-2 Spirit from the 509th Bomb Wing and F-22 Raptor aircraft from the 325th Fighter Wing.  The former flyover was the first Super Bowl flyover to be telecast in high definition.

Cyberwarfare
In early 2011, several news outlets, primarily in the United Kingdom, reported that Ntrepid, a California software and hardware company, had been awarded a $2.76 million U.S. government contract to create false online personas to counter the threat of terrorism and could possibly run their operation from MacDill AFB. These reports were never confirmed or acknowledged by the U.S. military.

BRAC 2005 
In its 2005 Base Realignment and Closure (BRAC) Recommendations, DoD recommended to realign Grand Forks Air Force Base, North Dakota. It would distribute the 319th Air Refueling Wing's KC-135R aircraft to the 6th Air Mobility Wing (6 AMW) at MacDill AFB, FL (four aircraft) and several other installations, increasing the number of KC-135R aircraft assigned to the 6 AMW from twelve to sixteen aircraft . Concurrent with this BRAC decision, the 6 AMW would also host a Reserve association with the Air Mobility Command-gained 927th Air Refueling Wing (927 ARW) of the Air Force Reserve Command (AFRC), the latter of which would be realigned and relocated from Selfridge ANGB, Michigan to MacDill AFB.  Under the Reserve Associate arrangement, both the 6 AMW and the 927 ARW would share the same KC-135R aircraft, while the 927 ARW would turn over their KC-135R aircraft to the 127th Wing (127 WG) of the Michigan Air National Guard at Selfridge ANGB.  The 927 ARW began relocation from Selfridge ANGB to MacDill AFB in 2007 and formally established itself at MacDill in April 2008.

Additional KC-135 Aircraft for 6 AMW / 927 ARW 
Long range USAF plans in the 2015 defense budget called for MacDill AFB to add eight additional KC-135R aircraft to its extant sixteen KC-135Rs in FY2018.  The 6 AMW would also increase manning by approximately 300 personnel. These additional KC-135R aircraft would come from other Air Force, Air Force Reserve Command and Air National Guard units transitioning to the KC-46A Pegasus aerial refueling aircraft and the timeline would be contingent on those other units completing their transition and achieving operational capability with the KC-46.

Departure of NOAA Aircraft Operations Center 
Until mid-2017, MacDill AFB also hosted the Aircraft Operations Center (AOC) of the National Oceanic and Atmospheric Administration (NOAA).  Commissioned officers of the NOAA Corps and NOAA civil servants fly "Hurricane Hunter" missions in NOAA's WP-3D Orion and Gulfstream IV aircraft, as well as other research missions in these and other assigned fixed-wing and rotary-wing aircraft.

With the anticipated increase in KC-135R aircraft and the need for additional maintenance hangar space, the Air Force informed NOAA in 2016 that they would no longer be able to host the NOAA Aircraft Operations Center, its aircraft, and the 110 NOAA personnel in Hangar 5 and its adjacent operations building at MacDill AFB.  In May 2017, NOAA began relocation to a new facility at Lakeland Linder International Airport, northeast of MacDill AFB, completing same in June 2017.

Airshow 

MacDill historically hosted an annual air show and "open house" enjoyed by thousands of spectators each year. However, there were no shows in 2002 and 2003 due to security concerns following the attacks on the United States of 11 September 2001 and the initiation of Operation Iraqi Freedom in 2003. The 2006 show was also canceled due to security concerns on base, but was reinstated in 2008.  It was cancelled again in 2013 due to defense budget constraints, but was reinstated again in 2014 as a biennial event.  AirFest 2016 was the first-ever airshow to feature a live webcast of the performers, including the headline act of the United States Air Force Thunderbirds.

Previous names

 Established as Southeast Air Base, Tampa, c. 24 May 1939
 MacDill Field, 1 December 1939 (formally dedicated, 16 Apr 1941)
 MacDill Air Force Base, 13 January 1948

Major commands to which assigned

 GHQ Air Force, 8 April 1940
 Third Air Force, 21 July 1942
 Continental Air Forces, 16 April 1945 (redesignated Strategic Air Command, 21 March 1946)

 Tactical Air Command, 1 July 1962
 Air Combat Command, 1 June 1992
 Air Mobility Command, 4 January 1994–present

Base operating units

 27th Air Base Squadron, 11 March 1940
 27th Air Base Group, 1 September 1940
 28th Base HQ and Air Base Squadron, c. 15 July 1942
 MacDill Field Base Detachment, 13 December 1943
 326th AAF Base Unit, 1 May 1944
 307th Airdrome Group, 15 August 1947
 307th Air Base Group, 12 July 1948
 306th Air Base Group, 1 September 1950

 809th Air Base Group, 16 June 1952 (redesignated 809th Combat Support Group, 1 January 1959)
 306th Combat Support Group, 1 June 1959
 836th Combat Support Group, 1 July 1962
 15th Combat Support Group, 8 June 1969
 1st Combat Support Group, 1 October 1970
 56th Combat Support Group, 1 July 1975
 6th Mission Support Group, 4 January 1994–present

Major units assigned

World War II

 HQ, Southeast Air District (later: Third Air Force), 18 December 1940 – January 1941
 HQ, III Bomber Command, 15 December 1941 – 8 April 1946
3d Bombardment Wing, 3 October 1940 – 5 September 1941
53d Pursuit Group, 15 January – 8 May 1941 (P-40)
29th Bombardment Group, 21 May 1940 – 25 June 1942 (B-17/B-18 Antisubmarine Patrols)
21st Bombardment Group, 27 June 1942 – 10 October 1943 (B-26 OTU)
336th Bombardment Group, 15 July – 10 August 1942; 13 October – 6 November 1943 (B-26 RTU)
488th Bombardment Group, 1 November 1943 – 1 May 1944 (B-17 RTU)

 Re-designated: 326th Army Air Forces Base Unit (Heavy Bombardment) 1 May 1944 – 30 June 1944
 Re-designated: 326th Army Air Forces Base Unit (Separation Station)

 89th Combat Crew Training Wing, 19 June 1944 – 8 April 1946 (Reconnaissance Training)
11th Photographic Group, January-5 October 1944
 323d Combat Crew Training Wing, 22 February 1945 – 4 August 1946 (Very Heavy Bomber)

World War II Training Units Assigned

 HQ XII Bomber Command, 13 March – 31 August 1942 (Deployed to England)
 19th Bombardment Wing, 24 July – 28 September 1942 (Deployed to Egypt)
 12th Bombardment Wing, 8 September 1942 – 28 November 1943 (Deployed to England)
 13th Bombardment Wing, 1 October 1942 – 10 May 1943 (Deployed to England)
 14th Bombardment Wing, 1 October 1942 – 9 May 1943 (Deployed to England)
 20th Bombardment Wing, 1 November 1942 – 8 May 1943 (Deployed to England)
 98th Bombardment Wing, 2 October 1940 – 5 September 1941 (Deployed to England)
 44th Bombardment Group, 15 January 1941 – 15 February 1942 (B-24 Antisubmarine Patrols)
 92d Bombardment Group, 26 March–May 1942 (B-17 1st Level Training)
 91st Bombardment Group, 16 May – 26 June 1942 (B-17 1st Level Training)
 99th Bombardment Group, 1–29 June 1942 (B-17 Organized)
 94th Bombardment Group, 15 June – 1 July 1942 (B-17 Organized)

 323d Bombardment Group, 21 August – 2 November 1942 (B-25 2d Level Training)
 386th Bombardment Group, 1 December 1942 – 9 February 1943 (B-26 1st Level Training)
 387th Bombardment Group, 1 December 1942 – 12 April 1943 (B-26 1st Level Training)
 463d Bombardment Group, 5 November 1943 – 3 January 1944 (B-17 2d Level Training)
 483d Bombardment Group, 7 November 1943 – 2 March 1944 (B-17 2d/3d Level Training)

Postwar units

311th Reconnaissance Wing, 17 April 1946 – 31 May 1947
 8th Bomber Command, 14 May – 10 November 1946
Eighth Air Force, 7 June – 1 November 1946
Tactical Air Command, 21 March – 26 May 1946

United States Air Force

 307th Bombardment Wing, 15 August 1947 – 16 May 1951 (B-29, B-50)
 306th Bombardment Group, 1 August 1948 – 16 June 1952 (B-29, B-50)
 306th Bombardment Wing, 1 September 1950 – 1 April 1953 (B-50)
 1 January 1959 – 1 March 1963 (B-47A/B/E, KC-97)
 305th Bombardment Wing, 2 January 1951 – 1 June 1959 (B-29, B-50, B-47B/E)
 4750th Air Defense Wing, 25 June 1959 – 25 June 1960
 17th Tow Target Squadron, 11 June 1959 – 15 June 1960 (B-57E)

 12th Tactical Fighter Wing, 25 April 1962 – 8 November 1965 (F-4C)
 15th Tactical Fighter Wing, 1 July 1962 – 1 October 1970 (F-4C/D)
 836th Air Division, 1 July 1962 – 30 June 1971
 1st Tactical Fighter Wing, 1 October 1970 – 30 June 1975 (F-4E)
 56th Tactical Fighter Wing, 30 June 1975 – 4 January 1994 (F-4D/E, F-16A/B/C/D)
 6th Air Mobility Wing, 4 January 1994–present (KC-135R, EC-135Y, CT-43A, C-37A)
 927th Air Refueling Wing (Associate), 1 April 2008 – present (KC-135R)

Role and operations
The 6th Air Refueling Wing (6 ARW) at MacDill AFB operates 24 KC-135R Stratotankers providing day-to-day mission support to more than 3,000 personnel in its immediate command, along with more than 50 mission partners comprising over 12,000 additional personnel, to include the United States Central Command (USCENTCOM), United States Special Operations Command (USSOCOM), United States Marine Forces Central Command (USMARCENT), and United States Special Operations Command Central (USSOCCENT).

The 6 ARW also has a collocated Air Force Reserve "Associate" wing at MacDill, the 927th Air Refueling Wing (927 ARW) of the Air Force Reserve Command (AFRC).  The 6 ARW and the 927 ARW operate and share the same assigned KC-135R Stratotanker aircraft.

The 6 AMW's 3,000-person force organized into four groups, in addition to the wing commander's immediate staff.

Approximately 15,000 people work at MacDill Air Force Base, with a significant number of military personnel and their families living on base in military housing, while remaining service-members and military families live off base in the Tampa Bay area. MacDill AFB is a significant contributor to Tampa's economy and the city is very supportive of the military community. In 2001 and 2003, the Tampa Bay area was awarded the Abilene Trophy, which annually honors the most supportive Air Force city in Air Mobility Command.

The base has a large visitor lodging facility known as the MacDill Inn, a DECA commissary, an AAFES base exchange, and numerous Morale, Welfare and Recreation (MWR) activities such as the Surf's Edge all ranks club, a base swimming pool, movie theater, marina, the Raccoon Creek Family Camp for recreational vehicles, the SeaScapes Beach House and the Bay Palms Golf Course.

In December 2021, the Air Force announced that the 6th Air Refueling Wing would re-equip with 24 of the new Boeing KC-46 Pegasus aerial refueling aircraft in the coming years.

6th Air Refueling Wing

The 6 ARW consists of:

6th Operations Group (6 OG)
91st Air Refueling Squadron (91 ARS)Operates the Boeing KC-135R Stratotanker, conducting worldwide aerial refueling/air mobility support.
50th Air Refueling Squadron (50 ARS)Established as an additional air refueling squadron in the 6 AMW in October 2017. Operates the Boeing KC-135R. Stratotanker.
911th Air Refueling Squadron (911 ARS)The 911 ARS is a geographically separated unit (GSU) of the 6 AMW, operating the KC-135R Stratotanker as an "active associate" squadron with the Air Force Reserve Command's 916th Air Refueling Wing (916 ARW) at Seymour Johnson AFB, NC.  The 911 ARS flies the 916 ARW's aircraft, supporting US military operations worldwide.
99th Air Refueling Squadron (99 ARS)The 99 ARS is a GSU of the 6 AMW, operating the KC-135R Stratotanker as an "active associate" squadron with the Alabama Air National Guard's 117th Air Refueling Wing (117 ARW) at Birmingham Air National Guard Base, AL.  The 99 ARS flies the 117 ARW's aircraft, supporting US military operations worldwide.
 6th Operations Support Squadron (6 OSS)Provides airfield management responsibilities for MacDill AFB, to include staffing and operation of the air traffic control tower, weather forecasting services, transient alert services and other flight operations and aircrew support functions.
 6th Maintenance Group (6 MXG)
 6th Aircraft Maintenance Squadron
 6th Maintenance Squadron
 6th Maintenance Operations Squadron
 6th Medical Group (6 MDG)
 6th Medical Operations Squadron
 6th Aerospace Medicine Squadron
 6th Dental Squadron
 6th Medical Support Squadron
 6th Mission Support Group (6 MSG)
 6th Communications Squadron
 6th Civil Engineering Squadron
 6th Comptroller Squadron
 6th Contracting Squadron
 6th Logistics Readiness Squadron
 6th Force Support Squadron
 6th Security Forces Squadron
 6th Air Mobility Wing Staff Agencies (e.g., Safety, Wing Plans, Legal, Chaplain, Public Affairs, Historian, etc.)

927th Air Refueling Wing

The 927 ARW is an associate unit of the 6th Air Refueling Wing of the Air Mobility Command (AMC), with both wings sharing and flying the same Boeing KC-135R Stratotanker aircraft, while ground support personnel augment their active duty counterparts in the 6 AMW.  The 927 ARW is part of the 4th Air Force (4 AF) of Air Force Reserve Command (AFRC).  If mobilized to active duty, the wing is operationally-gained by Air Mobility Command (AMC).  The 927 ARW has approximately 1,000 personnel consisting of part-time Traditional Reservists (TR) and full-time Air Reserve Technicians (ART) and Active Guard and Reserve (AGR).

The 927 ARW is commanded by Colonel Douglas Stouffer and the wing's Command Chief Master Sergeant is CMSgt Michael Klausutis.

The 927 ARW consists of:

 927th Operations Group (927 OG)
 45th Aeromedical Evacuation Squadron
63d Air Refueling Squadron (63 ARS)Operates the Boeing KC-135R Stratotanker. The KC-135R is a long-range aerial refueling (e.g., tanker) aircraft capable of refueling a variety of other aircraft in mid-air, anywhere in the world and under any weather conditions.
 927th Operations Support Squadron (927 OSS)Augments the 6 OSS in airfield management responsibilities for MacDill AFB, to include staffing and operation of the air traffic control tower, weather forecasting services, transient alert services and other flight operations and aircrew support.
 927th Maintenance Group (927 MXG)
 927th Aircraft Maintenance Squadron
 927th Maintenance Squadron
 927th Mission Support Group (927 MSG)
 927th Logistics Readiness Squadron
 927th Force Support Squadron
 927th Security Forces Squadron
 927th Air Refueling Squadrons not assigned to a group
 927th Aerospace Medicine Squadron
 927th Aeromedical Staging Squadron
 927th Air Refueling Wing Staff Agencies (e.g., Safety, Wing Plans, Comptroller, Legal, Chaplain, Public Affairs, Historian, etc.)

Other major tenant units

MacDill has 28 "mission partners" (tenant units) according to the official MacDill AFB website. Among these are:

Headquarters, United States Central Command (USCENTCOM)
Headquarters, United States Special Operations Command (USSOCOM)
Headquarters, United States Marine Forces Central Command (MARCENT)
Headquarters, United States Special Operations Command Central (SOCCENT)
Navy Operational Support Center Tampa (NOSC Tampa)
 subordinate unit of the United States Navy Reserve (USNR)
Joint Communications Support Element (JCSE) 
 subordinate unit of the Joint Enabling Capabilities Command (JECC)
598th Range Squadron (598 RANS) of the 23d Wing of the Air Combat Command (ACC)
 Geographically separated unit (GSU) of the 23d Fighter Group (23 FG), 23d Wing (23 WG), at Moody AFB, Georgia
290th Joint Communications Support Squadron (290 JCSS)
 subordinate unit of the Florida Air National Guard (FL ANG)
Joint Special Operations University (JSOU)
Joint Forces Staff College (JFSC) Satellite Campus
 Geographically separated field activity of JFSC at Naval Support Activity Hampton Roads, Virginia
 a division of the National Geospatial-Intelligence Agency (NGA)
Precision Measurement Equipment Laboratory (PMEL), a government-owned/contractor operated (GOCO) field activity of the Air Force Primary Standards Laboratory under the Air Force Metrology and Calibration Program Office (AFMETCAL)
Florida Area Office and the MacDill AFB Resident Office of the U.S. Army Corps of Engineers
Previously designated as Detachment 1 of the 23rd Wing (23 WG) until August 2014 and Det 1 of the 23d Fighter Group (23 FG) until August 2015, the 598 RANS is unique among MacDill AFB's tenant units in that it operates both (1) the Deployed Unit Complex (DUC) at MacDill AFB, providing a separate flight line facility and support infrastructure for detachments of USAF, U.S. Navy, U.S. Marine Corps (to include Reserve and Air National Guard) and NATO/Allied fighter, attack and special operations aircraft utilizing the nearby Avon Park Air Force Range (APAFR) facility, and (2) operates and maintains the entire 20,000 square mile APAFR facility approximately 65 miles east of MacDill AFB.  An Air Combat Command (ACC) organization, the 598 RANS reports to the Commander, 23d Fighter Group, at Moody Air Force Base, Georgia.

MacDill AFB also supports other Active Component and Reserve Component military activities and personnel of the U.S. Army, U.S. Navy, U.S. Marine Corps, U.S. Air Force and U.S. Coast Guard in the West Central Florida/Tampa Bay Region, as well as the large military retiree community in the Tampa Bay area and surrounding environs.

Based units 
Flying and notable non-flying units based at MacDill Air Force Base.

Units marked GSU are Geographically Separate Units, which although based at MacDill, are subordinate to a parent unit based at another location.

United States Air Force

Air Mobility Command

 6th Air Refueling Wing (Host wing)
 6th Operations Group
 6th Operations Support Squadron
 50th Air Refueling Squadron – KC-135R Stratotanker
 91st Air Refueling Squadron – KC-135R Stratotanker
 6th Maintenance Group
 6th Aircraft Maintenance Squadron
 6th Maintenance Operations Squadron
 6th Maintenance Squadron
 6th Medical Group
 6th Aerospace Medicine Squadron
 6th Dental Squadron
 6th Medical Operations Squadron
 6th Medical Support Squadron
 6th Mission Support Group
 6th Civil Engineer Squadron 
 6th Communications Squadron
 6th Contracting Squadron
 6th Force Support Squadron
 6th Logistics Readiness Squadron
 6th Security Forces Squadron

Air Force Reserve Command (AFRC)

 927th Air Refueling Wing 
 927th Aerospace Medicine Squadron
 927th Aeromedical Staging Squadron
 927th Operations Group
 45th Aeromedical Evacuation Squadron
 63rd Air Refueling Squadron – KC-135R Stratotanker
 927th Operations Support Squadron
 927th Maintenance Group
 927th Aircraft Maintenance Squadron
 927th Maintenance Squadron
 927th Mission Support Group
 927th Force Support Squadron
 927th Logistics Readiness Squadron
 927th Security Forces Squadron

Air Combat Command (ACC)

Air National Guard (ANG)

 Florida Air National Guard
 290th Joint Communications Support Squadron

United States Navy 
United States Navy Reserve

 Navy Operational Support Center - Tampa

United States Marines 
United States Marine Forces Central Command

 Headquarters United States Marine Forces Central Command

Defence Intelligence Agency 
National Intelligence University

 National Intelligence University Southern Academic Center

Department of Defense 
United States Central Command

 Headquarters United States Central Command
 Regional Joint Intelligence Training and Education Facility

United States Special Operations Command

 Headquarters United States Special Operations Command
 Headquarters United States Special Operations Command Central
 Joint Special Operations University

United States Transportation Command

 Joint Enabling Capabilities Command
 Joint Communications Support Element

National Defense University

 Joint Forces Staff College (GSU)

Incidents 

 On May 24, 2012, a Canadair CC-144A Challenger 600 (144601) of the RCAF hit a large turkey vulture on approach to MacDill. The plane landed safely with no fatalities. Temporary repairs were made to the radome and forward bulkhead before it was ferried back to Canada on July 10th. The plane has since been fully repaired.

See also

 Florida World War II Army Airfields
 List of United States Air Force installations
List of USAF Aerospace Defense Command General Surveillance Radar Stations

References

Other sources

 
 
 Maurer, Maurer (ed.). Air Force Combat Units of World War II. Washington, DC: U.S. Government Printing Office 1961 (republished 1983, Office of Air Force History).
 Ravenstein, Charles A. Air Force Combat Wings Lineage and Honors Histories 1947–1977. Maxwell Air Force Base, Alabama: Office of Air Force History 1984. .
 Mueller, Robert, Air Force Bases Volume I, Active Air Force Bases Within the United States of America on 17 September 1982, Office of Air Force History, 1989 
 Martin, Patrick (1994). Tail Code: The Complete History of USAF Tactical Aircraft Tail Code Markings. Schiffer Military Aviation History. .
 Rogers, Brian (2005). United States Air Force Unit Designations Since 1978. Hinkley, England: Midland Publications. .
  Cornett, Lloyd H. and Johnson, Mildred W., A Handbook of Aerospace Defense Organization 1946 – 1980, Office of History, Aerospace Defense Center, Peterson Air Force Base, Colorado
 Winkler, David F. (1997), Searching the skies: the legacy of the United States Cold War defense radar program. Prepared for United States Air Force Headquarters Air Combat Command.
 USAAS-USAAC-USAAF-USAF Aircraft Serial Numbers—1908 to present

External links

 
 6th Force Support Squadron – base welfare, recreation and support services
 
 

MacDill AFB
Aerospace Defense Command military installations
Military headquarters in the United States
Military installations in Florida
Radar stations of the United States Air Force
Installations of Strategic Air Command
1939 establishments in Florida
Neighborhoods in Tampa, Florida
Populated places on Tampa Bay
Tampa, Florida
Tampa Bay area
Military airbases established in 1939